Ismail Azzaoui (born 6 January 1998) is a Belgian footballer who plays as a winger for Dutch club Heracles.

Club career
Born in Brussels, Azzaoui started playing football with R.S.C. Anderlecht. In 2015, he joined VfL Wolfsburg from Tottenham Hotspur for a transfer fee of reportedly €500,000 and made his Bundesliga debut on 21 November 2015 against Werder Bremen. He substituted Daniel Caligiuri after 76 minutes in a 6–0 home win.

In early August 2017, Azzaoui was transferred to Dutch Eredivisie club Willem II for a season-long loan. After his return to  Wolfsburg, Azzaoui suffered a second major knee injury and was out for the whole 2018-19 season. On 27 October 2020 Azzaoui signed a one-year contract with Dutch side Heracles Almelo. On 1 December 2021 in a match against Feyenoord, Azzaoui suffered the third major knee injury of his career. One day later on 2 December 2021 it was announced he would miss the remainder of the 2021-22 season.

On 11 October 2022, Azzaoui returned to Heracles until the end of the season, with an option to extend for two more seasons.

International career
He is of Moroccan ancestry and plays for the Belgium U17 team.

Honors
Belgium U17
FIFA U-17 World Cup third place: 2015

Career statistics

References

External links

1998 births
Living people
Footballers from Brussels
Association football wingers
Belgian footballers
VfL Wolfsburg players
VfL Wolfsburg II players
Willem II (football club) players
Heracles Almelo players
Regionalliga players
Bundesliga players
Eredivisie players
Belgium youth international footballers
Belgian expatriate footballers
Expatriate footballers in Germany
Expatriate footballers in the Netherlands
Belgian expatriate sportspeople in Germany
Belgian expatriate sportspeople in the Netherlands
Belgian sportspeople of Moroccan descent